Claire Walsh (born 28 October 1994) is an Irish footballer who plays as a defender for Glasgow City of the Scottish Women's Premier League (SWPL) and the Republic of Ireland national team. A product of the American college soccer system with Central Connecticut Blue Devils, she has previously played club soccer for New England Mutiny in the United States and for Women's National League (WNL) clubs Peamount United and UCD Waves. She has also played inter county Ladies' Gaelic football for her native Wicklow GAA.

Club career

Walsh played for Lakeside FC of Blessington from under-12 to under-15 level, then progressed through Peamount United's youth system. Head coach Eileen Gleeson promoted Walsh into the senior squad at 16 years old for a 2011–12 UEFA Women's Champions League tie against Paris Saint-Germain Féminine. Walsh completed her Leaving Cert in 2012 and accepted an offer to play four years of college soccer for the Central Connecticut State University "Blue Devils".

In May 2015 Walsh signed for Women's Premier Soccer League club New England Mutiny. They reached the East Region final in the 2015 WPSL season, but Walsh was out injured for the 2–0 defeat by Boston Breakers Reserves. Returning in 2016 she made six appearances as New England Mutiny, now playing in United Women's Soccer, finished second in the Eastern Conference.

In the 2017 Women's National League, Walsh played for UCD Waves while completing a master's degree in computer science at University College Dublin. Playing under her former Peamount coach Eileen Gleeson, she captained The Waves to a fourth-place finish in the League and a 1–0 FAI Women's Cup final defeat by Cork City at the Aviva Stadium.

Ahead of the 2018 Women's National League season, Walsh returned to Peamount United: "My main reason for moving would be that I'm finished up studying in UCD. Peamount has always been my club and it's closer to home". In 2019 Walsh displayed good form and was named to the WNL Team of the Season, as The Peas recaptured the League title for the first time since 2011–12. She also played in Peamount's 2018 and 2019 FAI Women's Cup final defeats by Wexford Youths.

After helping Peamount United secure a League and Cup "double" in their 2020 campaign, Walsh signed a two-year professional contract with Scottish Women's Premier League club Glasgow City in July 2021.

International career
While enrolled at University College Dublin, Walsh represented Ireland at the 2017 Summer Universiade. Republic of Ireland coach Colin Bell gave Walsh her first senior call-up for the FIFA Women's World Cup qualifying fixture against Northern Ireland in September 2017. 

In August 2019 she won her first senior cap in a 3–0 friendly defeat by the United States at the Rose Bowl in Pasadena, California, under interim manager Tom O'Connor. Walsh entered the match as a substitute for her fellow County Wicklow woman Louise Quinn. She made a competitive substitute appearance in the opening UEFA Women's Euro 2022 qualifier against Montenegro, a 2–0 win at Tallaght Stadium on 3 September 2019.

In April 2021 Walsh started her first game for Ireland, a 1–0 defeat by Belgium at King Baudouin Stadium in Brussels.

Gaelic football
After returning from University in the United States, Walsh played Ladies' Gaelic football for Wicklow GAA, competing in the Ladies' National Football League and All-Ireland Intermediate Ladies' Football Championship. She decided to prioritise soccer in 2018.

References

External links
Claire Walsh at Football Association of Ireland

1994 births
Living people
Republic of Ireland women's association footballers
Women's association football defenders
Peamount United F.C. players
Republic of Ireland women's international footballers
Alumni of University College Dublin
Ladies' Gaelic footballers who switched code
DLR Waves players
Central Connecticut Blue Devils women's soccer players
Central Connecticut State University alumni
Women's Premier Soccer League players
New England Mutiny players
Women's National League (Ireland) players
Irish expatriate sportspeople in the United States
Association footballers from County Wicklow
Expatriate women's soccer players in the United States
Republic of Ireland expatriate association footballers
Expatriate women's footballers in Scotland
Irish expatriate sportspeople in Scotland
Scottish Women's Premier League players
Glasgow City F.C. players